Gymnocalycium gibbosum is a species of Gymnocalycium from Argentina.

References

External links
 
 

gibbosum
Flora of Argentina
Plants described in 1845